Laimos (before 1926: Ράμπη - Rampi) is a village in the Florina Regional Unit in West Macedonia, Greece. It is the seat of the Prespes Municipality.

Name
The village was originally known as Rampi (Greek: Ράμπη).

Among speakers of the Macedonian language in the village, they call the place Роби (Robi) and those in surrounding or more distant villages use the forms Раби (Rabi), Ръби  (R'bi) and Ръмби (R'mbi). France Bezlaj derived toponyms with the Slavic element pronounced as rob from rub (edge) and depending on their location, as meaning either corner, edge or shore. Pianka Włodzimierz supports that derivation for the village name, as its located on the shore and the local pronunciation of the toponym's o sound. Folk etymology associates the toponym with the Slavic word rob for slave. In Albanian, the village is called Rëmb.

Its modern name Laimos (Greek: Λαιμός) means 'neck' in Greek and is likely a reference to its position by a narrow promontory separating Small Prespa Lake from Great Prespa Lake.

History
Rampi was heavily damaged during the Ilinden Uprising and the First Balkan War. Later named Laimos, the village was again damaged during the World War II German occupation. The village participated in the Greek Civil War, but overall emerged mostly unscathed following its conclusion. After the Greek Civil War, many inhabitants moved to Yugoslavia and other communist Eastern European countries. 

In the early 1970s, the village had a church and mosque.

The village is crossed by the Paliorema river which empties into Great Prespa Lake. Until 1967, there was a border crossing with the Yugoslavian (now North Macedonian) village of Dolno Dupeni. The border crossing was closed by the Greek military junta for political reasons. As a result of the Prespa Agreement between Greece and North Macedonia, the border crossing is scheduled to reopen in 2023.

Demographics 
In 1865, Rampi had 50 Slavonic speaking Christian and 10 Muslim houses. In the early 1900s, 196 Slavonic speaking Christians and 100 Muslim Albanians lived in the village. The Greek census (1920) recorded 555 people in the village and in 1923 there were 123 inhabitants (or 20 families) who were Muslim. The Albanian village population was present until 1926 when it was replaced with prosfiges (Greek refugees), due to the Greek-Turkish population exchange. In 1926 within Rampi there were 30 refugee families from Asia Minor and 5 refugee families from an unidentified location. The Greek census (1928) recorded village 517 inhabitants. There were 23 refugee families (99 people) in 1928. In 1948, the village had 150 houses, mostly belonging to Slavonic speaking Christian community and 10 houses to the Greek refugee population. 

Laimos had 251 inhabitants in 1981. In fieldwork done by Riki Van Boeschoten in late 1993, Laimos was populated by Slavophones and a Greek population descended from Anatolian Greek refugees who arrived during the Greek-Turkish population exchange. The Macedonian language was spoken in the village by people over 30 in public and private settings. Children understood the language, but mostly did not use it.

References

External links
Prespes website

Populated places in Florina (regional unit)